Robert Duval (1510–1567), also referred as Robertus Vallensis, was a French alchemist. In 1886, John Ferguson stated that the De veritate et antiquitate artis chemicae by Duval stands out as 'the first history of chemistry.' This work was published in 1561, in Paris.

References

1510 births
1567 deaths
French alchemists
16th-century alchemists